A Man Called Hero is a 1999 Hong Kong wuxia film directed by Andrew Lau. It is loosely based on the manhua series Chinese Hero: Tales of the Blood Sword by Hong Kong artist Ma Wing-shing. It won the 1999 Golden Horse Award for Best Visual Effects.

Plot
The story begins in early Republican China. After passing a test, Hero Hua is accepted by Pride, a master swordsman, as his second apprentice. When he returns home, he is horrified to see that his parents have been murdered by foreigners for opposing the opium trade. That night, Hero breaks up the foreigners' party and kills them in revenge. He spends the rest of the night with his lover, Jade. The next morning, he flees from China to avoid arrest and sails to America.

16 years later, Hero's childhood friend, Sheng, and Hero's son, Sword Hua, arrive in New York City on the first day of the Chinese New Year. They visit China House, the biggest inn in Chinatown, where they see a lion dance performance led by the Boss of China House. A group of thugs show up and demand that the Boss hand over a monk, Luohan, whom they believe is hiding in China House. After defeating and driving away the thugs, the Boss brings Sword and Sheng to meet Luohan. Luohan tells them how he met and befriended Hero on board the ship bound for America, and their experiences as labourers in Steel Bull Canyon. Later, Sword and Sheng visit Jade's grave, where Sheng tells Sword how he and Jade travelled to New York City 16 years ago in search of Hero. Hero and Jade were reunited and married in New York City. While visiting the shop where Sword's parents took their wedding photographs, Sword and Sheng sense someone following them. Sword surprises the stalker and corners her after a brief chase through the streets. She identifies herself as Kate, the daughter of Hero's senior, Shadow.

Kate leads Sword and Sheng to her father. Shadow tells them how he rescued Hero from Steel Bull Canyon when Hero was buried in the sand after being falsely accused of murdering two men. Hero and Shadow encountered the Five Elements Ninjas and defeated them. During the fight, Hero injured the female ninja, Wood, but spared her life and sent her for medical treatment. When Wood develops a crush on Hero, the Gold Ninja, who is secretly in love with Wood, becomes very jealous. Jade had just given birth to a pair of twins in China House when the Gold Ninja set fire to the building. During the chaos, Bigot, a traitor, kidnapped Sword's twin sister and disappeared. There have been no news of her since then. Jade died in Hero's arms shortly after due to excessive blood loss during childbirth.

Shadow continues narrating the story. After Jade's death, Hero met a fortune teller, who told him he was born under the Star of Death and is destined to lead a life of loneliness because misfortune will befall those who are close to him. Hero entrusted his baby son, Sword, to Sheng before leaving with Shadow to meet their master, Pride. In Japan, they witnessed a duel between Pride and his rival, Invincible. Pride defeated Invincible but sustained internal injuries and died not long after the duel. Before his death, Pride passed Hero the martial arts manual China Secret and transferred all his inner energy to him.

Back in the present at China House, the Boss, Sword, Sheng, Luohan and others come up with a plan to liberate the labourers at Steel Bull Canyon. They disguise themselves as a Chinese opera troupe, infiltrate the canyon, and catch the supervisors off guard in a surprise attack. Luohan sacrifices himself in a suicide attack to stop the supervisors from throwing explosives at the escaping labourers. Sword corners Bigot and demands the whereabouts of his twin sister, but Bigot suddenly pulls out a pistol and shoots him. Bigot is about to kill Sword when Hero shows up and finishes him off. Hero uses his inner energy to create an explosion and prevent a group of horsemen from advancing further. They return to China House in triumph.

Sword is happy to see his father in person for the first time after hearing the stories about him. However, Hero appears cold towards his son and constantly keeps a distance away because he strongly believes the fortune teller's words that he will lose his loved ones if he gets close to them. Hero also meets Wood, who has maintained her crush on him for the past 16 years, but he refuses to accept her. She warns Hero that her master, Invincible, has arrived in New York City. Since Pride is dead, Invincible turns on Hero, Pride's successor, to finish the duel. The next morning, Invincible shows up at China House and fights with the Boss and Sword until Hero appears and stops him. Hero and Invincible then duel on top of the Statue of Liberty. In the meantime, Black Dragon Commander leads his men to attack China House but are eventually forced to leave by the police. At the Statue of Liberty, Hero eventually defeats and destroys Invincible. Before the movie ends, Sword and Sheng prepare to leave America while Hero watches them from a distance and walks away in the opposite direction.

Cast

 Ekin Cheng as Hero Hua
 Shu Qi as Wood Ninja
 Kristy Yang as Jade
 Nicholas Tse as Sword Hua
 Yuen Biao as Boss of China House
 Jerry Lamb as Sheng
 Dion Lam as Shadow
 Jordan Chan as Shadow (voice)
 Anthony Wong as Pride
 Ken Lo as Monk Luohan
 Francis Ng as Invincible
 Elvis Tsui as Bigot
 Mark Cheng as Gold Ninja
 Sam Lee as Fire Ninja
 Grace Yip as Kate
 Jude Poyer as Bull
 Cheng Pei-pei as Hero's mother
 Wong Ban as Manager of China House
 Yu Ka-ho as Earth Ninja
 Benjamin Yuen as Water Ninja
 Thomas Hudak as Black Dragon commander
 Hon San as Big Stone
 Frankie Ng as Moon
 Wong Chi-hung
 Fung Wai-lun
 Huang Kai-sen
 Lam Chi-tai
 Wang Xin-fen
 Wong Chun-chung
 Liu Yue
 Wang Xin-feng
 He Jun
 Wang Jiang-hua
 Zhang Jin-shuang
 Lu Yang

Music
The music and songs for the film were composed by Chan Kwong-wing.

 Tin Sat Ku Hsing (天煞孤星; Star of Death), the theme song, performed in Cantonese by Ekin Cheng. Cheng also sang the Mandarin version of this song, titled Tianya Haijiao (天涯海角; To the Ends of the Earth).
 Faa Cheng Ho (花正好; The Flower is Good), insert song, performed in Cantonese by Ekin Cheng. Cheng also sang the Mandarin version of this song, titled Ni Zou Dao Na Li (你走到哪裡; Wherever You Go).
 Dai Yat Ngan (第一眼; First Glance), insert song, performed in Cantonese by Nicholas Tse.

Awards and nominations

Awards
 1999 Golden Horse Film Awards
 Best Visual Effects - Centro Digital Pictures Limited

Nominations
 1999 Golden Horse Film Awards
 Best Film Editing - Danny Pang
 Best Action Choreography - Dion Lam
 19th Hong Kong Film Awards (2000)
 Best Action Choreography - Dion Lam
 Best Costume Make Up Design - Lee Pik-kwan
 Best Original Film Score - Chan Kwong-wing
 Best Original Film Song - Albert Leung, Chan Kwong-wing
 Best Sound Design - Zeng Jingxiang

See also
 Chinese Hero: Tales of the Blood Sword
 The Blood Sword
 The Blood Sword 2
 The Legend of Hero

References

External links
 
 
 

1999 films
Hong Kong martial arts films
Wuxia films
Films directed by Andrew Lau
Adaptations of works by Ma Wing-shing
Films based on Hong Kong comics
Live-action films based on comics
Japan in non-Japanese culture
1990s Hong Kong films